= Young Nationalists =

Young Nationalists can refer to:

- Young Nationalists, the youth group of the Australian Nationalist Party
- Young Nationalists (Junge Nationalisten), the youth group of Die Heimat (German political party), a German far-right group
